The Askin–Cutler ministry (1968–1969) or Second Askin ministry was the 63rd ministry of the New South Wales Government, and was led by the 32nd Premier, Bob Askin, of the Liberal Party in coalition with the Country Party, led by Charles Cutler. It was the second of six occasions when Askin was Premier; and when Cutler was Deputy Premier.

Background
Askin was elected to the New South Wales Legislative Assembly in 1950 and served continuously up until 1975, representing variously the seats of Collaroy and Pittwater. Rising through the Liberal Party ranks, Askin served as Deputy Leader from 1954 until he was elected Leader of the NSW Liberal Party and Leader of the NSW Opposition, following the defeat of the Morton/Hughes–led coalition by Cahill's Labor at the 1959 election. Cutler was elected to the NSW Legislative Assembly in 1947 and served continuously up until 1975, representing the seat of Orange. Elected Deputy Leader of the Country Party in 1958 and, like Askin, Cutler was elected as leader of his party following the 1959 state election, replacing Davis Hughes. The Askin/Cutler–led Liberal/Country coalition was defeated at the 1962 election by Labor's Bob Heffron. In April 1964 Jack Renshaw replaced Heffron as Leader of the Labor Party and became Premier. Twelve months later, Renshaw called an election held on 13 May 1965; however after 24 years of consecutive Labor governments, Askin and Cutler led the coalition to government at the 1965 state election.

The first Askin/Cutler ministry was commissioned from 1965 until the 1968 state election; when the coalition again won office.

Composition of ministry
This ministry covers the period from 5 March 1968 until 11 February 1969, when Askin and Cutler reconfigured the Liberal/Country ministry.

 
Ministers are members of the Legislative Assembly unless otherwise noted.

See also

Members of the New South Wales Legislative Assembly, 1968–1971
Members of the New South Wales Legislative Council, 1967–1970

Notes

References

 

New South Wales ministries
1968 establishments in Australia
1969 disestablishments in Australia